George Harold Lommen (September 14, 1895 – September 19, 1942) was an American lawyer and politician.

Lommen was born in Caledonia, Houston County, Minnesota and graduated from Caledonia High School. He received his law degree from St. Paul College of Law (William Mitchell College of Law) and then  practiced law in Biwabik, St. Louis County, Minnesota. He served as mayor on Biwabik, Minnesota and was the Biwabik Township Attorney. Lommen served in the Minnesota House of Representatives in 1925 and 1926 and in the Minnesota Senate from 1927 until his death in 1942. Lommen was a Republican. He died in Caledonia, Minnesota and was buried in Caledonia, Minnesota.

References

1895 births
1942 deaths
People from Caledonia, Minnesota
People from St. Louis County, Minnesota
William Mitchell College of Law alumni
Minnesota lawyers
Mayors of places in Minnesota
Republican Party members of the Minnesota House of Representatives
Republican Party Minnesota state senators